Eumitra alokiza is an extinct species of sea snail, a marine gastropod mollusk, in the family Mitridae, the miters or miter snails.

References

alokiza
Gastropods described in 1879